Mustapha Ahmed (born 8 June 1960) is a Ghanaian politician and member of the Sixth Parliament of the Fourth Republic of Ghana representing the Ayawaso North Constituency in the Greater Accra Region on the ticket of the National Democratic Congress.

Early life and education 
Ahmed was born on 8 June 1960 in Bawku in the Upper East Region. He hails from Bawku, a town in the Upper East Region of Ghana. He graduated from University of Ghana Medical School and Dentistry and obtained his bachelor's degree's in Dental Surgery in 1983.

Career 
Ahmed is a dental surgeon by profession. He is also a Ghanaian politician.

Politics 
Ahmed is a member of the National Democratic Congress (NDC). He became member of the Third Parliament of the Fourth Republic of Ghana representing the Ayawaso East Constituency in January 2001 after winning his poll in the 2000 Ghanaian general election. He was member of the Fourth and Fifth Parliament following his re-election in the 2004 and 2008 Ghanaian general election respectively.

2004 Election 
Ahmed was elected in the 2004 Ghanaian general elections as the member of parliament for the Ayawaso East constituency in the fourth parliament of the fourth republic of Ghana from 7 January 2005 to 6 January 2009. He was elected with 49,354votes out of 87,902total valid votes cast. This was equivalent to 56.1% of the total valid votes cast. He was elected over Abdiel Godly Babaaali of the People's National Convention and Daddah Braimah B. of the New Patriotic Party. These obtained 4,095votes and 34,453 votes respectively of the total valid votes cast. These were equivalent to 4.7% and 39.2% respectively of the total valid votes cast. Ahmed was elected on the ticket of the National Democratic Congress. His constituency was a part of the 10 constituencies won by the National Democratic Congress in the Greater Accra region in that elections. In all, the National Democratic Congress won a total 128 parliamentary seats in the fourth parliament of the fourth republic of Ghana.

2008 Elections 
Ahmed was re-elected in the 2008 Ghanaian general elections as the member of parliament for the Ayawaso East constituency in the 5th parliament of the 4th republic of Ghana from 7 January 2009 to 6 January 20013. He was elected with 44,655votes out of 78,120total valid votes cast. This was equivalent to 57.16% of the total valid votes cast. He was elected over Mohammed Salisu Baba of the New Patriotic Party, Alhaji Mohammed Muftao of the People's National Convention, Bernard Anvuur Billy of the Democratic Freedom Party, Amin Abdul Karim Larry of the Convention People's Party; and Ahaji Haruna Bubakari Dabre, Daniel Danquah, Mohammed Amin Lamptey and Samuel Kwesi Gyasi - all independent candidates. These obtained  33.31%, 0.98%, 0.76%, 2.25%, 0.0%, 0.4%, 4.67% and 0.49% respectively of the total valid votes cast. Ahmed was re-elected on the ticket of the National Democratic Congress. His constituency was a part of the 18 constituencies won by the National Democratic Congress in the Greater Accra region in that elections. In all, the National Democratic Congress won a total 114 parliamentary seats in the 4th parliament of the 4th republic of Ghana.

Personal life 
Ahmed is Muslim. He is married with three children.

References 

1960 births
Living people
Ghanaian Muslims
National Democratic Congress (Ghana) politicians
Ghanaian MPs 2001–2005
Ghanaian MPs 2005–2009
Ghanaian MPs 2009–2013
21st-century Ghanaian politicians
People from Greater Accra Region
Ghanaian dentists
University of Ghana Medical School alumni
Alumni of Opoku Ware School